Crestwood, New South Wales may refer to:

Crestwood, Queanbeyan
Crestwood, Sydney